Liphistius batuensis is a species of trapdoor spider from Malaysia. It is thought to be restricted to the Batu Caves and a cave in Templer Park, near Kuala Lumpur. It was first collected by H. C. Abraham in 1923, and has been described as a living fossil.

The movement of an insect against these threads is detected by the spider, which then rushes out and captures the insect.

Spiders of all ages may fall prey to cave-dwelling centipedes.

References

Liphistiidae
Cave spiders
Fauna of Batu Caves
Spiders of Asia
Spiders described in 1923
Endemic fauna of Selangor